DMC International Imaging (DMCii) is the company that manages the Disaster Monitoring Constellation for the International Charter for Space and Major Disasters. It also sells satellite imaging services under contract and manages the operations of spacecraft such as UK-DMC1 & UK-DMC2. DMCII is a wholly owned subsidiary of Surrey Satellite Technology Ltd (SSTL). It recently struck a space deal with Beijing-based 21AT to build three high-resolution earth observation satellites to map the growth of China.

References

External links
 Surrey Satellite Technology Ltd
 DMC International Imaging
 International Charter for Space and Major Disasters
 SSTL's UK space blog

University of Surrey
Aerospace companies of the United Kingdom